Pachydota is a genus of moths in the family Erebidae. The genus was erected by George Hampson in 1901.

Species
 Pachydota affinis Rothschild, 1909
 Pachydota albiceps Walker, 1856
 Pachydota drucei Rothschild, 1909
 Pachydota ducasa Schaus, 1905
 Pachydota iodea Herrich-Schäffer, 1855
 Pachydota nervosa Felder, 1874
 Pachydota peruviana Rothschild, 1909
 Pachydota punctata Rothschild, 1909
 Pachydota rosenbergi Rothschild, 1909
 Pachydota saduca Druce, 1895
 Pachydota striata Dognin, 1893

References

Phaegopterina
Moth genera